Jelle François Maria Van Damme (born 10 October 1983) is a Belgian retired professional footballer who played as a centre-back, left-back or left midfielder. He played for clubs in Belgium, England, Germany, the Netherlands and the United States. He also earned over 30 caps for the Belgium national team.

Club career

Early career
Van Damme started his career at Beveren, before he made a short move to neighbour club Lokeren where he played in the youth teams. He then signed for Germinal Beerschot in 2001, making his senior debut in the Jupiler League. Beerschot were linked with Ajax and the Amsterdam club soon offered him a trial stay beginning in February 2002.

In summer 2002, Van Damme moved permanently to Ajax where he showed promise in the Dutch Cup. In the 2002–03 season, he played in the Champions League and started as a regular player in the squad before breaking his toe in November 2002. The next season, he helped Ajax again qualify for the Champions League group stage but he had few chances to play in the first team's title winning campaign, with the club preferring the Brazilian Maxwell at full back. This limited chance of game time led him to sign for Southampton of the Premier League in June 2004, for £2.5 million.

He made little impact during his spell with Southampton, playing just six times during the 2004–05 season, as the club were relegated to the Championship. He spent the 2005–06 season on loan at German Bundesliga club Werder Bremen but again struggled to hold down regular football, making just eight appearances (three starts), as the club finished runners-up. In search of more playing opportunities, Van Damme returned to his homeland to sign for Anderlecht in June 2006 for €500,000.

Anderlecht

His four-year spell at Anderlecht was much more successful as he won two Jupiler League championships (twice runners-up) and the 2008 Belgian Cup, and appeared in the Champions League group stages several times. Van Damme scored in the 2–1 win at rivals Club Brugge that won the second of these league titles in 2010.

His time in Brussels was the source of an unsavoury incident however, when Standard Liège defender Oguchi Onyewu accused him of racial abuse alleging that Van Damme called Onyewu a "dirty monkey" during the 2008–09 Championship playoff between the clubs. Onyewu subsequently sued Van Damme, although the case was withdrawn in February 2011 after a meeting between the two players when Van Damme apologised for any offence he may have given.

Wolverhampton Wanderers
Van Damme returned to the Premier League in June 2010 by joining Wolverhampton Wanderers. He signed a three-year deal, with the option of a fourth year, for a fee reported to be around £2.5 million. Sell-on clauses relating to his 2006 move to Anderlecht mean that Southampton should receive between 10 and 15 per cent of the fee received from Wolves, estimated at £300,000.

He scored his first, and only, goal for Wolves against Fulham on 11 September 2010. He struggled to settle at the club though, and on 29 November 2010, he signed a pre-contract agreement to return to his Belgian homeland in a three-and-a-half year deal with Standard Liège, after just six appearances for the Midlands club.

Standard Liège
Van Damme's return to Belgium was officially ratified when the January 2011 transfer window opened. He made his Standard debut (playing as captain) in a 2–0 loss at former club Anderlecht on 23 January.

LA Galaxy
On 26 January 2016, it was announced that Van Damme had joined LA Galaxy. He made his debut on 24 February 2016 in a CONCACAF Champions League quarterfinal leg against Santos Laguna.

Royal Antwerp
In August 2017, Van Damme returned yet again to Belgium as he was signed by Royal Antwerp for $235,000. Van Damme said the main reason for leaving the LA Galaxy was that he wanted to be closer to his children.

Lokeren
On 3 July 2019, he signed a one-year contract with Lokeren.

Retirement
Van Damme retired from professional football in February 2021.

International career
Van Damme made his debut for the Belgium national team on 29 March 2003 in a 4–0 friendly loss to Croatia. He appeared for the national team during their unsuccessful qualifying campaigns for the 2006 and 2010 World Cups and UEFA Euro 2008.

Personal life
Van Damme was married to former tennis player Elke Clijsters, sister of Kim Clijsters, whom he wed in May 2008 in Bree, Belgium. The marriage ended in 2016. They have two children.

Career statistics

Club

Honours
Ajax
Eredivisie:  2003–04

Werder Bremen
Bundesliga runner-up: 2005–06

Anderlecht
Belgian First Division:  2006–07, 2009–10
Belgian Cup: 2007–08
Belgian Super Cup: 2006, 2007

Standard Liège
Belgian Cup: 2010–11

Individual
MLS All Star: 2016

References

External links
 
 Article on legal ramifications of lawsuit between Onyewu  and Van Damme

1983 births
Living people
Footballers from East Flanders
Belgian footballers
Belgium international footballers
Belgian Pro League players
Eredivisie players
Premier League players
Bundesliga players
Major League Soccer players
K.S.K. Beveren players
K.S.C. Lokeren Oost-Vlaanderen players
Beerschot A.C. players
AFC Ajax players
Southampton F.C. players
SV Werder Bremen players
R.S.C. Anderlecht players
Wolverhampton Wanderers F.C. players
Standard Liège players
LA Galaxy players
Royal Antwerp F.C. players
Belgian expatriate footballers
Belgian expatriate sportspeople in the Netherlands
Expatriate footballers in the Netherlands
Belgian expatriate sportspeople in England
Expatriate footballers in England
Belgian expatriate sportspeople in Germany
Expatriate footballers in Germany
Association football defenders
Association football midfielders
Major League Soccer All-Stars
Designated Players (MLS)
People from Lokeren